Björn Jonsson (born 14 January 1944) is a retired Swedish footballer. Jonsson made 89 Allsvenskan appearances for Djurgården and scored 0 goals.

References

Swedish footballers
Allsvenskan players
Djurgårdens IF Fotboll players
1944 births
Living people
Association footballers not categorized by position